MetaboMiner is a tool which can be used to automatically or semi-automatically identify metabolites in complex biofluids from 2D-NMR spectra. MetaboMiner is able to handle both 1H-1H total correlation spectroscopy (TOCSY) and 1H-13C heteronuclear single quantum correlation (HSQC) data. It identifies compounds by comparing 2D spectral patterns in the NMR spectrum of the biofluid mixture with specially constructed libraries containing reference spectra of approximately 500 pure compounds. MetaboMiner protocol is available via MetaboMiner website.

See also
Bioinformatics

References

External links
MetaboMiner website
Biological databases